This is a list of fraternities and sororities at Michigan State University.

National Panhellenic Conference
Alpha Chi Omega
Alpha Omicron Pi
Alpha Phi
Alpha Xi Delta
Chi Omega
Delta Gamma
Gamma Phi Beta
Kappa Alpha Theta
Kappa Delta
Kappa Kappa Gamma
Phi Sigma Rho
Pi Beta Phi
Sigma Delta Tau
Sigma Kappa
Zeta Tau Alpha

North American Interfraternity Conference

Alpha Epsilon Pi
Alpha Gamma Rho
Alpha Kappa Psi
Alpha Sigma Phi
Beta Theta Pi
Delta Kappa Epsilon
Delta Sigma Phi
FarmHouse
Kappa Sigma
Lambda Phi Epsilon
Phi Delta Theta
Phi Gamma Delta
Phi Kappa Psi
Phi Kappa Sigma
Phi Kappa Tau
Pi Kappa Alpha
Pi Kappa Phi
Psi Upsilon
Sigma Alpha Epsilon
Sigma Alpha Mu
Sigma Beta Rho
Sigma Nu 
Sigma Pi
Tau Kappa Epsilon
Theta Chi
Theta Delta Chi
Triangle Fraternity
Zeta Beta Tau
Zeta Psi

National Pan-Hellenic Council
Alpha Phi Alpha
Alpha Kappa Alpha
Kappa Alpha Psi
Omega Psi Phi
Delta Sigma Theta
Phi Beta Sigma
Zeta Phi Beta
Sigma Gamma Rho
Iota Phi Theta

Multicultural Greek Council
alpha Kappa Delta Phi
Alpha Phi Gamma
Delta Tau Lambda
Delta Xi Phi
Lambda Theta Alpha
Phi Iota Alpha
Sigma Iota Alpha
Sigma Lambda Beta
Sigma Lambda Gamma

References

External links
 Michigan State University Greek Life Website

Michigan State University
Fraternities and Sororities
Michigan State University fraternities and sororities